Eddie Lawrence  ( – ) was a Welsh international footballer. He was part of the Wales national football team between 1930 and 1931, playing 2 matches. He played his first match on 1 February 1930 against Ireland and his last match on 31 October 1931 against Scotland.

At club level, Lawrence played in the English Football League for Wrexham, Clapton Orient, Notts County and Bournemouth & Boscombe.

See also
 List of Wales international footballers (alphabetical)

References

1907 births
Welsh footballers
Wales international footballers
Place of birth missing
Date of death missing
Druids F.C. players
Wrexham A.F.C. players
Leyton Orient F.C. players
Notts County F.C. players
AFC Bournemouth players
Grantham Town F.C. players
Association footballers not categorized by position